Nurpur Noon is a village situated near Bhalwal in Sargodha District, Punjab,  Pakistan.

Nurpur Noon is inhabited by over 8,000 people mostly of the Noon subcaste of Rajputs.

Prominent people from Nurpur Noon
Nurpur Noon has produced some prominent political figures in the past, such as Malik Mohammad Hayat Noon and his son,  Malik  Sir Feroz Khan Noon who served in the Viceroy's Council of India before independence and later, after the creation of Pakistan, served as country's Foreign Minister and then Prime Minister of Pakistan in 1958. Feroz Khan Noon and her wife Viqar-un-Nisa Noon both played main role in accession of Gwadar to Pakistan.

References

Populated places in Sargodha District